Epiperipatus paurognostus is a species of velvet worm in the Peripatidae family. This species is brown with a series of light brown arcs on each side forming circles down its back. Males of this species have 26 or 27 pairs of legs, usually 27; females have 27 to 29, usually 29. The type locality is in Minas Gerais, Brazil.

References

Onychophorans of tropical America
Onychophoran species
Animals described in 2011